The seventeenth season of Deutschland sucht den Superstar began on 4 January 2020 on RTL. As in the previous year, the jury consisted of Dieter Bohlen, Oana Nechiti, Xavier Naidoo and Pietro Lombardi; before the live shows began, Xavier Naidoo was excluded from the jury, his place took Florian Silbereisen. Alexander Klaws was the new host. The season ended on 4 April 2020 with Ramon Roselly as the winner, after having received 80.82% percent from the public.

Auditions and "Recall"
After 12 casting episodes, recorded on the Drachenfels, on Forggensee and on the Hanse Gate Hamburg, the 126 progressed candidates went to the "Recall" in Sölden. They initially appeared in larger groups, and those who progressed thereafter in groups of two, three or four. 22 of them - plus the four winners of the Golden CDs - received a ticket to South Africa. There they were supported by the vocal coaches Juliette Schoppmann and André Franke. The remaining 11 candidates competed in an additional Recall in the Landschaftspark Duisburg-Nord for the Top 7 in the Live Shows. Groups of men and women sang in groups of three or two, after which the jury sent four participants to the Live Shows. The remaining seven superstar aspirants had to perform solo performances, which led to the decision on the remaining three places. At the first time in the History of the show there are only 7 contestants perform in the Live Shows.

Finalists

Live shows
For the first time, the remaining three jurors each have a CD, on which they can give their live show candidate their 5% voting right.

Color key

Week 1: Top 7
Original airdate: 13 March 2020

Judges' gave their 5% Golden CD
 Bohlen: he gave his CD to the presenter Alexander Klaws, because he was hosting for the first time a live show
 Nechiti: Paulina Wagner
 Lombardi: Marcio Pereira Conrado

Week 2: Top 6
Original airdate: 21 March 2020

Judges' gave their 5% Golden CD
 Bohlen: Chiara D'Amico
 Silbereisen: Lydia Kelovitz
 Nechiti: Marcio Pereira Conrado
 Lombardi: Paulina Wagner

Week 3: Top 5 - Semi-Final
Original airdate: 28 March 2020

In the semi-final, the top 5 performed two single songs: a "loud" and a "quiet" song.

Judges' gave their 5% Golden CD
 Bohlen: Ramon Kaselowsky
 Silbereisen: Paulina Wagner
 Nechiti: Paulina Wagner
 Lombardi: Joshua Tappe

Week 4: Final
Original airdate: 4 April 2020

Elimination chart

References

External links 
 Official website

Season 17
2020 in German music
2020 German television seasons